Porong Ri is a mountain in the Langtang region of the Himalayas. At  it is the 86th highest mountain in the world. The peak is located in Tibet, China, at about one kilometre northeast of the Nepal border.

Porong Ri was first climbed in 1982 by a Japanese expedition team.

References

External links
Porong Ri on Peakery

Mountains of Tibet
Seven-thousanders of the Himalayas